The 1987 Nabisco Dinah Shore was a women's professional golf tournament, held April 2–5 at Mission Hills Country Club in Rancho Mirage, California. This was the 16th edition of the Nabisco Dinah Shore, and the fifth as a major championship.

King won this event two more times, in 1990 and 1997.

Final leaderboard
Sunday, April 5, 1987

Playoff
On the first extra hole (#15), King hit her tee shot into the rough and then scrambled for par, while Sheehan missed a birdie putt. 
At #16, Sheehan again had a birdie opportunity, but three-putted from  while King sank a three-footer for par to win.

Scorecard

{|class="wikitable" span = 50 style="font-size:85%;
|-
|style="background: Pink;" width=10|
|Birdie
|style="background: PaleGreen;" width=10|
|Bogey
|}

References

External links
Golf Observer leaderboard

Chevron Championship
Golf in California
Nabisco Dinah Shore
Nabisco Dinah Shore
Nabisco Dinah Shore
Nabisco Dinah Shore
Women's sports in California